Nelson Martinez  (born March 3, 2001) is an American soccer player who plays as a defender.

Career

Loudoun United 
Martinez made his professional debut on June 5, 2019, in a 3-2 win against Swope Park Rangers. He signed his first professional contract with Loudoun United on June 26, 2020, for the remainder of the 2020 season.

North Carolina FC 
In March 2021, Martinez joined North Carolina FC of USL League One.

References

2001 births
Living people
American soccer players
Association football midfielders
Loudoun United FC players
Soccer players from Virginia
United States men's youth international soccer players
USL Championship players
People from Woodbridge, Virginia
American sportspeople of Salvadoran descent